Spennithorne railway station was on the Wensleydale Railway, in North Yorkshire, England.

The station was opened by the Bedale and Leyburn Railway on 19 May 1856, and served the village of Spennithorne. It closed temporarily on 1 March 1917, before reopening on 18 September 1920. It closed permanently on 26 April 1954.

The station consisted of a two-storey station master's house and a single-storey building for the station office and waiting room.  There were no sidings or goods facilities. Mr Francis Johnson was the station master for three years prior to 1908 after which he moved to Scruton railway station. He had a reputation for beautifying the stations under his charge.

Business was always likely to be small at this remote location, and in the 30 years to 1914 the station averaged 2,616 passengers a year, with receipts of £289.

References

External links

 Video footage of Spennithorne railway station. 
 Spennithorne station on navigable 1947 O. S. map

Disused railway stations in North Yorkshire
Railway stations in Great Britain opened in 1856
Railway stations in Great Britain closed in 1917
Railway stations in Great Britain opened in 1920
Railway stations in Great Britain closed in 1954
Wensleydale
Former North Eastern Railway (UK) stations